The Convento de los Carmelitas Descalzos is a Discalced Carmelite convent dating to 1643 located in the city of Toledo (Castile-La Mancha, Spain. Azulejos panels from the 18th century covers the central nave and the chapels. The altarpieces was introduced from other buildings.

References

External links
 Convento de los Carmelitas Descalzos of Toledo website

Roman Catholic churches completed in 1643
Discalced Carmelite Order
Roman Catholic churches in Toledo, Spain
Convents in Spain
Azulejos in Castilla–La Mancha
17th-century Roman Catholic church buildings in Spain